Who Made Who is a soundtrack album by Australian hard rock band AC/DC. Released on 26 May 1986, the album is the soundtrack to the Stephen King film Maximum Overdrive. The album was re-released in 2003 as part of the AC/DC Remasters series.

Background
Three tracks on the album – "Who Made Who" and the instrumentals "D.T." and "Chase the Ace" – were newly written and recorded by AC/DC for the album. The remaining tracks were previously released by the band. Only one song, "Ride On", features previous lead vocalist Bon Scott, who died in 1980. All others feature his replacement, Brian Johnson.

Along with the album, the band released a 73-minute videotape, which contained music videos for the songs "Who Made Who", "You Shook Me All Night Long", "Shake Your Foundations" (remixed), "Hells Bells", and footage from a live performance of "For Those About to Rock (We Salute You)", which was filmed in Detroit in 1983.

The video for the title track, directed by David Mallet, was recorded at the Brixton Academy in London and features a theme of countless clones of AC/DC guitarist Angus Young.  According to the book AC/DC: Maximum Rock & Roll, these clones consisted of hundreds of fans who came from all over the UK, many of whom slept in the freezing cold in front of Brixton Academy for the opportunity to take part. This group was made up of approximately 300 members of the band's British fan club as well as others who had simply heard about the event on the radio.

Lyrics
The song "Who Made Who" was written for the Stephen King movie Maximum Overdrive, whose theme was machines that came alive and began killing people. The lyrics explore the idea of the gadgets and devices created by mankind coming to rule over human beings instead of the other way around, the irony where humans become subservient to the technology they created.

Reception

Though the film it was created for was derided by critics and financially flopped, the song "Who Made Who" became the band's most successful single in years, reaching No. 16 in the UK and No. 33 in the US. It was also voted second best track of 1986 by the readers of Hit Parader magazine. Following this, a re-issue of "You Shook Me All Night Long" was released from the album, peaking at #46 in the UK. The album has sold five million copies in the US. Stephen Thomas Erlewine of AllMusic calls the album "a ripping AC/DC retrospective" and applauds the band "rescuing songs like 'Sink the Pink' from otherwise mediocre albums."

Track listing

Album

Video
A VHS titled "Who Made Who" was also released to support the album.
"Who Made Who"
"You Shook Me All Night Long" (alternate version, filmed in 1986 specifically to promote the "Who Made Who" album)
"Shake Your Foundations"
"Hells Bells"
"For Those About to Rock (We Salute You)" [Joe Louis Arena, Detroit - November 1983]

 All five videos were re-released as part of the Family Jewels DVD set.

Personnel
 Brian Johnson - lead vocals
 Angus Young - lead guitar
 Malcolm Young - rhythm guitar, backing vocals
 Cliff Williams - bass guitar, backing vocals
 Simon Wright - drums
 Bon Scott - lead vocals on "Ride On"
 Phil Rudd - drums on "You Shook Me All Night Long", "Ride On", "Hells Bells" and "For Those About to Rock (We Salute You)"
 Mark Evans - bass guitar and backing vocals on "Ride On"

Charts

Weekly charts

Year-end charts

Certifications

References

External links
 Lyrics on AC/DC's official website
 
 Soundtracks for Maximum Overdrive on IMDb

Album chart usages for Billboard200
AC/DC compilation albums
AC/DC soundtracks
Film soundtracks
Albums produced by George Young (rock musician)
Albums produced by Harry Vanda
Albums produced by Robert John "Mutt" Lange
1986 soundtrack albums
Atlantic Records soundtracks
Albert Productions albums